The Gulf Beaches Public Library, located within the City of Madeira Beach, is a nonprofit corporation created and supported by the Towns of Redington Shores, North Redington Beach, Redington Beach, and the Cities of Madeira Beach and Treasure Island, Florida. The library is run by a ten-member Board of Trustees; each municipality appointing two members. It is a member of the Pinellas Public Library Cooperative.

History
The idea of a library to serve the residents of the mid-beach communities began at a September 1949 meeting of the Gulf Beach Woman's Club. Under the guidance of the first club president, Mrs. Polly Van Dyke, a committee of six women began to collect books, which finally found a permanent home in 1952, when a one-room building was erected on 140th Avenue in Madeira Beach. The library continued to grow over the next 15 years, and in 1969 a new building was dedicated at the library's present location. In 1988, the library expanded to house its ever-growing collection. A 3,600 square foot space was added to the existing building to create more shelving and reading space, bringing the total square footage of the library to 10,000. In 2008, the library board fired the director of the library. In 2016, the library began work on updating its long range plan.

References

External links
 

Libraries in Florida